Hugh Orr (21 January 1878 – 19 April 1946) was an Australian-born English first-class cricketer.

Orr at some point in his life came to England. In 1902 he joined Hampshire County Cricket Club, making his first-class debut against Worcestershire County Cricket Club. Orr would play one more match in 1902 before taking a four-year break from the game.

In 1907 he returned to play for Hampshire, playing four matches during the 1907 County Championship season. His final match for Hampshire came against Surrey. Orr was not known for his batting, and instead was used as a bowler, taking 11 wickets for the club at an average of 32.72. The 1907 season was his final one for Hampshire.

In 1912 Orr played a single first-class match for the Royal Navy against the Army, where in the Armies second innings Orr claimed his only five wicket haul in his first-class career, taking 7/74. This effort improved his overall first-class bowling figures to 19 wickets at the average of 24.63.

Died Wimbledon Putney Common, London on 19 April 1946.

External links
Hugh Orr at Cricinfo
Hugh Orr at CricketArchive

1878 births
1946 deaths
Cricketers from New South Wales
English cricketers
Hampshire cricketers
People from Deniliquin
Royal Navy cricketers
Rugby union players from New South Wales
Scottish rugby union players
Australian emigrants to the United Kingdom